The Cookellaceae are a family of fungi with an uncertain taxonomic placement in the class Dothideomycetes.

References

External links
Index Fungorum

Myriangiales
Dothideomycetes families